Sursassite is a sorosilicate mineral. It was first discovered in 1926. It was first found in the Sursass (Oberhalbstein), a district of Graubünden, Switzerland. It is generally found in deposits of metamorphosed manganese.

Notes

Sorosilicates
Monoclinic minerals
Minerals in space group 11